Dominic Jephcott (born 1957) is a RADA-trained English actor and writer. He is known for his work in The Beiderbecke Affair, The Beiderbecke Connection, Midsomer Murders, and in Holby City and Casualty, as the adulterous Doctor Alistair Taylor.

Early life and education 
Jephcott was born on 28 July 1957 in Coventry, Warwickshire. Jephcott worked professionally as a child actor.  He graduated from the Royal Academy of Dramatic Art in 1975. He became a member of the Royal Shakespeare Company in 1978 and later worked extensively in television.

Acting career 
Jephcott played  Sir Andrew Ffoulkes in The Scarlet Pimpernel, Mount in Good and Bad at Games, Reggie in The Jewel in the Crown, Det. Sgt. Hobson BA in The Beiderbecke Affair (later Det. Insp. Hobson PhD in The Beiderbecke Connection), Capt. Sandy Ransom in "Rumpole and the Bright Seraphim", Magnus Strove in Paradise Postponed, David Warner in The Bill, George Compton in A Touch of Frost, Dr. Sam Fallowfield in Dalziel and Pascoe, Simon Dymock in Judge John Deed, Suspicious Monk in Relic Hunter, Father Jonathan in Doctors, Peter Gosford in Casualty and Alistair Taylor in Holby City. He was David Durance in the first London production of Indian Ink.

Jephcott appeared in two episodes of Midsomer Murders as two different characters; "Death's Shadow" and seven years later in 2006, "Four Funerals and a Wedding".

His film credits include All Quiet on the Western Front (1979), the horror film Inseminoid (1981), The Opium War (1997), An African Dream (1990), and O Jerusalem (2006). Jephcott has also worked in radio including the part of Marlowe in The Christopher Marlowe Mysteries. This aired briefly on BBC Radio 4 in 1993.

Personal life 
Jephcott is married to author Kelleigh Greenberg-Jephcott.  They have collaborated on screenplays selected by the Academy of Motion Picture Arts and Sciences’ Nicholl Fellowship, the Austin Film Festival, and Francis Ford Coppola’s Zoetrope.

Filmography

Theatre performances (selected)

References

External links

The Christopher Marlowe Mysteries

English male film actors
English male soap opera actors
Living people
Alumni of RADA
1957 births